The 1944 NC State Wolfpack football team was an American football team that represented North Carolina State University as a member of the Southern Conference (SoCon) during the 1944 college football season. In its first season under head coach Beattie Feathers, the team compiled a 7–2 record (3–2 against SoCon opponents) and outscored opponents by a total of 173 to 63.

Schedule

References

NC State
NC State Wolfpack football seasons
NC State Wolfpack football